Tony Nardi (born 1958) is an Italian-Canadian actor, playwright and theatre director based in Toronto, who has performed on stage and in film and television.

Fluent in four languages; he has appeared in French, Italian and English-language productions, including over 60 plays and 70 films and television series. He won the Genie Award for Best Performance by an Actor in a Leading Role twice, for La Sarrasine (which he co-wrote) and My Father's Angel, with three additional nominations.

His series of monologues, Two Letters...And Counting!, was nominated for a Dora Mavor Moore Award for Outstanding New Play and earned Nardi a nomination for the Siminovitch Prize in Theatre long list. He has worked with Théâtre français de Toronto, Persephone Theatre, Great Canadian Theatre Company, and the Stratford Festival. He has also taught Acting and Directing courses at the University of Toronto and York University.

Career

Acting
Nardi made his stage debut in a 1978 production of Solzhenitsyn, directed by Alexander Hausvater. Since then, he has performed in over 60 plays including For Those in the Peril on the Sea, Sandinista, Nineteen Eighty-Four, La Storia Calvino, A Flea in Her Ear and The Lesson.

He received a Montreal Gazette Critic's Award in 1979 for his role in an adaptation of George Orwell’s Nineteen Eighty-Four, a Dora Mavor Moore Award for Artistic Excellence – Collective – in 1985 for La Storia Calvino, garnered a Dora Award nomination in 2001 for his role in A Flea in Her Ear, and a Dora Award in 2002 for Outstanding Performance for his role in The Lesson. In 2007 he received a Best Actor Thespis Award for Two Letters.

His movie roles include Caffè Italia, Montréal, Concrete Angels, Cruising Bar, La Sarrasine, An Imaginary Tale, Mr. Aiello (La Déroute), My Father's Angel, Almost America, Corbo and Kiss Me Like a Lover (Embrasse-moi comme tu m'aimes), and his TV credits include Rossini's Ghost, Galileo: On the Shoulders of Giants, Bonanno: A Godfather's Story, Almost America, Il Duce Canadese and Indian Summer: The Oka Crisis.

A four-time Genie Award nominee, he has won twice for Best Actor for roles in La Sarrasine (1992) and My Father's Angel (2001), for which he had also received a Best Actor award at the Sonoma Wine and Country Film Festival in 2000. He received the Guy L’Écuyer Award for his role in La Déroute in 1998. In 2010, the year marking the 30th Genie Awards, he made the Academy's 30th Anniversary Top 10 list in the Lead Actor category in Canadian cinema – a ranking based on the number of wins and nominations over the 30-year period.

In television, he received a Gemini Award nomination in 2006 for his role in Il Duce Canadese and a Best Actor Award at the Geneva International Film Festival, Tous Écrans/All Screens, in 1999, for his role in Ken Finkleman's Foolish Heart.

Writing
Nardi is co-author with Vincent Ierfino of the play La Storia dell'Emigrante. Written in Calabrian, English and French, the play was the first in Canada (on record) written by an Italian-Canadian and addressing an Italian-Canadian reality. In 1982 La Storia dell'Emigrante received the first James Bullet Award for Best Original Canadian play at the Ontario Multicultural Theatre Festival.

A Modo Suo: A Fable, written in Calabrian in 1990, received a Dora Award nomination for Best Play. An English translation was published in its entirety in the Canadian Theatre Review in 2000.

He collaborated on the screenplays for La Sarrasine and La Déroute.

Two Letters (2006), two theatrical monologues based on two actual letters sent to a film/television producer and two theatre critics, received a 2007 Dora Award Nomination for Outstanding New Play. "...And Counting!" - a postmortem of "Two Letters" and journey into the state of culture and funding in Canada was presented in 2008 in Toronto and Montreal, at Factory Theatre and McGill University, respectively and in 2010 at the Festival TransAmeriques in Montreal. In 2008 he was nominated for a Siminovitch Prize in Theatre for playwriting.

"Letter One", "Letter Two", and "...And Counting!" were filmed in front of a live audience and released respectively in 2011, 2013 and 2014. "Letter One" was screened at Les Rendez-vous du cinéma québécois in Montreal in 2011, at Hot Docs in Toronto in 2012 and the Italian Contemporary Film Festival at the Toronto International Film Festival (TIFF) in 2012. "Letter Two" was screened at the Italian Contemporary Film Festival at TIFF in 2013. "...And Counting!" was screened at the 2014 Italian Contemporary Italian Film Festival at TIFF.

Academia
Nardi began teaching acting and directing courses in Autumn of 2017. He has instructed courses at the University of Toronto and University of Toronto Scarborough, and directed courses at York University. He is a PhD candidate in Performance at the University of Toronto, specializing in “the impact of cultural background and first language on performance in Canadian theatre, film and TV."

Honors
In 1992, Nardi received the 125th Anniversary of the Confederation of Canada Medal, awarded to Canadians for significant contribution to their fellow citizens, to their community, or to Canada.

Personal life
Nardi is multilingual. His primary languages are French and English, but he is also fluent in both Standard Italian and Calabrian. Nardi lived in Montreal with Janne Mortil, his former partner, in 1999-2000.

Filmography

Film

Television

Awards and nominations

References

External links
 
Canadian Theatre Encyclopedia Entry
Full text of "Two Letters ...And Counting!"

1958 births
20th-century Canadian dramatists and playwrights
20th-century Canadian male actors
21st-century Canadian dramatists and playwrights
21st-century Canadian male actors
Canadian male film actors
Canadian male stage actors
Canadian male television actors
Canadian male voice actors
Canadian people of Calabrian descent
Dora Mavor Moore Award winners
Italian emigrants to Canada
Living people
People from Calabria
Best Actor Genie and Canadian Screen Award winners
Canadian male dramatists and playwrights
20th-century Canadian male writers
21st-century Canadian male writers